Kebby is an African given name. Notable people with the name include:

Kebby Boy (born 1990), Burundian singer and songwriter
Kebby Maphatsoe, South African politician
Kebby Musokotwane (1946–1996), Zambian politician 

African given names